Gustavo Becerra-Schmidt (August 26, 1925 – January 3, 2010) was a Chilean composer.

Biography and Career
Becerra-Schmidt was born in Temuco, Chile. He studied at The Chilean National Conservatory, and was taught by Pedro Humberto Allende. Then in Europe from 1953 to 1956, where he brought back the avant-garde music culture from Europe to Chile. 3 years later, Becerra-Schmidt became the director of the Instituto de Extension Musical (IEM) in 1959 to 1962, the IEM was an establishment by Domingo Santa Cruz, it aimed to centralize and manage the Chilean music repertoire and to support Chilean music organizations. During this time and after, Becerra-Schmidt was a teacher in the Chilean National Conservatory, he held this position until 1971 when he became a Cultural attaché between Chile and Bonn. 2 years later, Becerra-Schmidt moved to Germany due to the 1973 Chilean coup d'état, in Germany, Becerra-Schmidt taught at the University of Oldenburg beginning in 1974.

Becerra was also an important teacher. Some of his pupils are among the most important composers of Chile, these include Luis Advis, Sergio Ortega, Fernando García and Cirilo Vila.

Becerra-Schmidt died on January 3, 2010, at his home in Oldenburg.

Compositions
Becerra was a prolific Chilean composer, his catalogue includes hundreds of compositions that goes from traditional to avant-garde to Aleatoric music, and from popular songs to large-scale cantatas, symphonies and oratorios. However, a large part of his musical career was politically involved, some of his cantatas included verses that were related to the Pre-Columbian era and Spanish colonization, Becerra-Schmidt's student Fernando García also wrote works based around political figures.

Highlights among his output are the cantatas La Araucana and Lord Cochrane de Chile, the Macchu Picchu oratorio on texts by Pablo Neruda, the Concerto for Flute and Strings, and a most recent Harp Concerto from 2006. Important in his catalogue are also the electroacoustic works.

Selected works

La Araucana
Lord Cochrane de Chile
Macchu Picchu 
3 Symphonies 
2 Piano Concertos 
Violin concerto 
Flute concerto
7 string quartets 
Saxophone quartet
Parsifae (opera) 
La muerte de Don Rodrigo (opera) 
Llanto por el hermano solo (for choir)
Responso para José Miguel Carrera (for voice, wind quintet, piano, and percussion) 
 Trio for violin, flute and piano
3 Sonatas for violin
Provocacion (Minidrama) 
Oda al mar 
Nocturno

Media

References

Notes

External links
  (in Spanish)

1925 births
2010 deaths
Chilean composers
Chilean male composers
20th-century classical composers
21st-century classical composers
Chilean expatriates in Germany
Male classical composers
20th-century male musicians
21st-century male musicians